Magheraculmoney is a civil parish in County Fermanagh, Northern Ireland. It is situated in the historic barony of Lurg.

Towns and villages
The civil parish contains the villages of Ederny, Kesh and Lack.

Townlands
The civil parish contains the following townlands:

Aghagaffert
Aghaleague
Aghama
Agharainy
Aghinver
Ardatrave
Ardess Glebe
Ardore
Ardvarny East
Ardvarny West
Ballynant
Barnalackan
Cady
Camplany
Carn
Carrickagreany
Clareview
Cleenishgarve Island
Cleenishmeen Island
Cloy
Cornacrea
Crevinish
Crevinishaughy Island
Croneen
Croneen Barr
Davy's Island
Diviny
Drumadraghy
Drumard
Drumbane
Drumbarna
Drumcahy
Drumcose
Drumcrin
Drumgivery
Drumhoney
Drumkeen
Drummacalara
Drummoyagh
Drumnacross
Drumnarullagh
Drumreane
Drumsawna Beg
Drumsawna More
Drumwhinny
Edenaclogh
Edenagee
Edenamoghil Black
Edenamoghil Umder
Edenclaw Great
Edenclaw Little
Ederny
Fargrim
Gargrim
Gay island
Glasmullagh
Glenarn
Goladoo
Gorteen
Gubbaroe
Inismakill
Killycappy
Killylea
Kilsmullan
Kiltierney
Kinnausy Island
Lack
Largy
Lavaran
Leaghan
Letterboy
Lisingle
Lurganboy
Manoo
Mantlin
Meenmore
Mullaghfarne
Mullanasaggart
Mullanrody
Nedsherry
Parkhill
Rabbit Island
Raw
Rosscah
Rosscolban
Shanmullagh
Sheemuldoon
Slievebane
Stranadarriff
Stranahone
Tattykeel Lower
Tattykeel Upper
Tom's Island
Tullanaginn
Tullanaglare
Tullanaglug
Tullanaguiggy
Tullycallrick
White Island

See also 
 List of civil parishes of County Fermanagh

References